Jacob William Hoggard (born July 9, 1984) is a Canadian former singer-songwriter who was the lead singer for the pop-rock band Hedley. Before Hedley was formed, Hoggard competed on the second season of Canadian Idol in 2004 when he placed third. 

In 2018, Hoggard was arrested and charged with sexual assault. He has since been found guilty of sexual assault causing bodily harm and sentenced to five years in prison. He is currently out on bail pending an appeal to his conviction; acquitted of sexually assaulting a second, and facing a new, third charge of sexual assault.

Early life
Jacob Hoggard was born on July 9, 1984, in Surrey, British Columbia, Canada. He was raised in Abbotsford, British Columbia and Surrey, British Columbia. He is of partial Italian origin. He was educated in Surrey, British Columbia at Senator Reid Elementary School and Mennonite Educational Institute, Yale Secondary School in Abbotsford and at L.A. Matheson Secondary School, he was also in the City Central Learning Centre.

Career
Hoggard started his career on Canadian Idol. He appeared on the second season of the show and made it to the final three. He formed the band Hedley along with Dave Rosin, Tommy Mac and Chris Crippin. The band released their debut single "On My Own", which reached number 1 on the Canadian Singles Chart.

In 2010, Hoggard took part of Young Artists for Haiti and the song reached number 1 on the Canadian Hot 100 charts.

Hoggard took part of Artists Against Bullying in 2012 to record and release a remake of Cyndi Lauper's "True Colors" for Bullying Awareness Week. In 2015, Hoggard was named the host of the 2015 Juno Awards.

Personal life
Hoggard married his high school sweetheart in 2005, which ended in divorce in 2009. Hoggard married Canadian actress Rebekah Asselstine on December 31, 2018.

Sexual Assaults
Since announcing the indefinite hiatus from Hedley following the sexual assault allegations, Hoggard testified in court on May 24, 2022 that he has made a living as a carpenter in B.C.

Sexual misconduct and rape 
In 2005, Hoggard and his band members were suspects in a sexual assault case where a minor was found unconscious and shoeless outside a London, Ontario, venue where the band had played. Rohypnol was present in the victim's blood. The police investigation ended when the victim refused a rape kit and the band sent the venue management a letter stating any discussion of the incident would result in a lawsuit.

In February 2018, he announced that he would be stepping away from his career indefinitely following Hedley's tour.

On July 23, 2018, Hoggard was charged with one count of sexual interference and two counts of sexual assault causing bodily harm, involving a child under 16 and a woman. His trial date was scheduled to begin on 28 November 2018. On August 23, 2019, it was announced that Hoggard's trial would begin on September 27. On January 25, 2021, Hoggard's trial was pushed back to 2022 because of the COVID-19 pandemic. In January 2022, Hoggard's trial was once again postponed, due to the COVID-19 pandemic. It began on May 2, 2022, and on June 5, 2022, a Toronto jury found Hoggard guilty of sexual assault causing bodily harm against an Ottawa woman in the fall of 2016. The jury also acquitted Hoggard of sexually assaulting a 16-year-old child who was a fan and one count of sexual interference.

Hoggard was charged in March 2022 with sexual assault causing bodily harm in a June 2016 encounter in Kirkland Lake, Ontario. The charge was made public on June 2. Hoggard was scheduled to appear in court on August 4, 2022. 

On October 20, 2022, Hoggard was sentenced to five years in prison after being found guilty of sexually assaulting an Ottawa woman.

Filmography

References

1984 births
Living people
21st-century Canadian criminals
21st-century Canadian guitarists
21st-century Canadian male singers
Canadian Idol participants
Canadian male guitarists
Canadian male singer-songwriters
Canadian people convicted of rape
Canadian people of Italian descent
Canadian pop guitarists
Canadian pop singers
Canadian rock guitarists
Canadian rock singers
Canadian songwriters
Musicians from British Columbia
People from Abbotsford, British Columbia
People from Surrey, British Columbia